The Statute of Westminster 1327, also known as Statute of Westminster IV, was a law of Edward III of England.

The law included possibly the earliest recorded mention of conductors, stipulating that the wages of conductors (conveyors) of soldiers from the shires to the place of assembly would no longer be a charge upon the Shire. The statute also provided, for the first time, for the formal appointment of keepers of the peace, a position transformed in 1361 into justices of the peace.

External links
 
 

1327 in England
1320s in law
Acts of the Parliament of England
History of the City of Westminster
Medieval English law